Lihong V. Wang is the Bren Professor of Medical Engineering and Electrical Engineering at the Andrew and Peggy Cherng Department of Medical Engineering at California Institute of Technology and was formerly the Gene K. Beare Distinguished Professorship of Biomedical Engineering at Washington University in St. Louis. Wang is renowned for his contributions to the field of Photoacoustic imaging technologies and inventing the world's fastest camera with more than 10 trillion frames per second. Wang was elected as the member of National Academy of Engineering (NAE) in 2018.

Education 
Wang received B.S. and M.S. degrees in optics engineering from Huazhong University of Science & Technology respectively in 1984 and 1987.
Wang earned a PhD from Rice University in Houston, Texas.

Career 
Wang's laboratory was the first to report functional photoacoustic tomography, 3D photoacoustic microscopy (PAM), photoacoustic endoscopy, photoacoustic reporter gene imaging, the photoacoustic Doppler effect, the universal photoacoustic reconstruction algorithm, microwave-induced thermoacoustic tomography, ultrasound-modulated optical tomography, time-reversed ultrasonically encoded (TRUE) optical focusing, nonlinear photoacoustic wavefront shaping (PAWS), compressed ultrafast photography (10 trillion frames/s), Mueller-matrix optical coherence tomography, and optical coherence computed tomography. Wang was the recipient of several award, including NIH's FIRST, NSF's CAREER, NIH Director's Pioneer, and NIH Director's Transformative Research awards.  Wang also received the OSA C.E.K. Mees Medal "for seminal contributions to photoacoustic tomography and Monte Carlo modeling of photon transport in biological tissues and for leadership in the international biophotonics community". Prof. Wang has been conferred upon by an honorary doctorate degree by Lund University located in Sweden for his contributions towards the field of Biomedical Imaging.

Wang has received more than 37 research grants as principal investigator with an estimated cumulative budget of more than $47M. Wang has published more than 470 peer-reviewed journal articles including Nature, Science, and PNAS. His book Biomedical Optics: Principles and Imaging was one of the first in the field, and received the Joseph W. Goodman Book Writing Award. Wang was the editor-in-chief of the Journal of Biomedical Optics from 2010-2017.

In 2018, Wang was elected as the member of National Academy of Engineering(NAE) for "inventions in photoacoustic microscopy enabling functional, metabolic, and molecular imaging in vivo".

Awards 
 2018 Michael S. Feld Biophotonics Award.

See also 
 Michael Stephen Feld
 The Optical Society

References

External links 
 Lihong V. Wang Profile at Caltech
 Lihong V. Wang Lab
 Lihong V. Wang on Google Scholar

American biomedical engineers
Rice University alumni
Year of birth missing (living people)
Living people
Washington University in St. Louis faculty
Washington University physicists
Huazhong University of Science and Technology alumni
Members of the United States National Academy of Engineering
American electrical engineers
Chinese electrical engineers
Chinese emigrants to the United States